José María Arancibia (11 April 1937) is a prelate of the Roman Catholic Church. He served as auxiliary bishop of Córdoba from 1987 until 1993 when he became coadjutor archbishop of Mendoza. He was archbishop of Mendoza from 1996 until his retirement in 2012.

Life 
Born in Buenos Aires, he was ordained to the priesthood on 22 September 1962.

On 26 February 1987 he was appointed auxiliary bishop of Córdoba and titular bishop of Pumentum. Arancibia received his episcopal consecration on the following 28 May from Raúl Francisco Primatesta, cardinal and archbishop of Córdoba, with archbishop of Paraná, Estanislao Esteban Karlic, and bishop of Cruz del Eje, Omar Félix Colomé, serving as co-consecrators.

On 13 February 1993 he was appointed coadjutor archbishop of Mendoza, where he was installed on 28 May. He succeeded as archbishop of Mendoza on 25 March 1996. On 10 November 2012 he retired upon reaching the age of 75 years, the retirement age for priests.

References

External links 

 Archbishop José María Arancibia on Catholic-Hierarchy.org

1951 births
Living people
21st-century Roman Catholic bishops in Argentina
Roman Catholic bishops of Córdoba
Roman Catholic archbishops of Mendoza